Mount Gilboa is a mountain in Barnstable County, Massachusetts. High Pole Hill is located west-southwest and Mount Ararat is located northeast of Mount Gilboa.

References

Mountains of Massachusetts
Mountains of Barnstable County, Massachusetts